Heart First is a 1984 album by British singer Hazell Dean. It was her first album as a mainstream pop artist following the top ten successes of "Searchin' (I Gotta Find a Man)" and "Whatever I Do (Wherever I Go)". It was the first album to be produced by the highly successful Stock Aitken Waterman production team.

Background 

Released in late 1984, the album featured the top 10 hits "Searchin' (I Gotta Find a Man)" and "Whatever I Do (Wherever I Go)" as well as the singles "Back in My Arms (Once Again)" and "No Fool (For Love)", which both reached No.41. "Harmony" and "Devil In You" were also released as singles in Germany.

Heart First was released on the Proto record label and produced by Stock Aitken Waterman - the first album the trio were responsible for. The first single they produced for Dean was "Whatever I Do (Wherever I Go)", which was originally titled "Dance Your Love Away" and reworked by Waterman when Dean was unhappy with the chorus. The engineer of the song had accidentally mixed the drum beats backwards, which produced an unusual juddering sound across the recording, but Waterman was so impressed with the result that it stayed on the song. The single went on to sell 300,000 copies in the UK and was the producers' first top-10 hit together.

Despite the hit, Stock Aitken Waterman were in dire financial straits, as was the record company, Proto. Waterman was keen to complete the album and considered it to be the very first full Hi-NRG album - a genre normally limited to singles and 12" remixes. The album was completed on a shoestring budget, but everyone involved was happy with the finished product. However, problems were apparent at the record company and despite the hit singles, the album failed to chart.  Dean blamed the album's failure on poor promotion and bad timing. Dean parted company with Proto Records after the fourth single was released, but did go on to work with Stock Aitken Waterman again in future years.

The album was released on Compact disc in 1984 in Germany and elsewhere in 1997. It was later re-released on 15 March 2010 as a remastered special edition featuring bonus tracks through the UK label Cherry Red Records. This version included the song "Stay In My Life" (Dean's entry for the A Song for Europe competition in 1984), as well as B-sides and extended mixes not previously available on CD.

Track listing

The cassette version of the album also featured the song "Evergreen".

All songs produced by Stock Aitken Waterman, except "Searchin' (I Gotta Find a Man)" by Ian Anthony Stephens.

References 

1984 albums
Albums produced by Stock Aitken Waterman